Amphidromus bernardfamyi is a species of air-breathing tree snail, an arboreal gastropod mollusk of the family Camaenidae.

Habitat 
Amphidromus bernardfamyi is usually found in an arboreal habitat.

Distribution 
The distribution of Amphidromus bernardfamyi is restricted to the Sermata Islands, part of Maluku province, Indonesia.

Etymology 
This species is named after the Frenchman Bernard Famy, who identified the species type.

References 

bernardfamyi
Gastropods described in 2017
Fauna of Indonesia